The Coolpix P6000 is a digital camera introduced by the Nikon Corporation in August 2008.

The built-in GPS (to support geocoding photos automatically) is a first in its price-range.
The Ethernet port is also an unusual feature, but the camera is configured to only allow access to Nikon's My Picturetown online photo service.
The P6000 was succeeded in 2010 by the larger Coolpix P7000 which lacks GPS.

Features 
 13.5 megapixel CCD sensor
 EXPEED Image Processing
 Face-priority AF 
 Bright 2.7-inch High Resolution LCD and Optical Viewfinder 
 Optical Image Stabilization
 NRW – raw image format
 Active D-Lighting 
 USB 2.0 
 Built-in GPS receiver for auto-geotagging
 magnesium alloy front panel 
 Wireless Optional Remote Control ML-L3 for wireless shutter release
 VGA video

NRW – raw format 

The raw image format for the Nikon P6000 is NRW.  This format is supported in Windows using the Windows Imaging Component (WIC) and on Mac OS X after installation of the Digital Camera Raw Compatibility Update 2.3.  On other systems, it will require special software plugins.  Adobe Camera Raw 4.6 included preliminary support, and full support is provided in Adobe Camera Raw 5.2.

References

External links 

COOLPIX P6000 Product page at Nikon USA
COOLPIX P6000 Product page at imaging.nikon.com
COOLPIX P6000 at Nikon's COOLPIX microsite

P6000
Cameras introduced in 2008